Børge Jensen (18 June 1911 – 12 January 1967) was a Danish wrestler. He competed in two events at the 1932 Summer Olympics.

References

External links
 

1911 births
1967 deaths
Danish male sport wrestlers
Olympic wrestlers of Denmark
Wrestlers at the 1932 Summer Olympics
Sportspeople from Aalborg